Read My Mind is the nineteenth studio album by American country music artist Reba McEntire, released on April 26, 1994.  It was preceded by the first single, "Why Haven't I Heard From You" which peaked at No. 5 on the country chart.  The album's second single, "She Thinks His Name Was John", was the first country song to address the topic of AIDS. Due to the subject matter, some radio stations shied away from putting it into heavy rotation. The third single, "Till You Love Me" became McEntire's first song to chart on the Billboard Hot 100.  "The Heart Is a Lonely Hunter" the album's fourth single, topped the country singles chart. The album peaked at No. 2 on both the country album chart and the Billboard 200 and is certified 3 times platinum by the RIAA.  The album was released at perhaps the peak of McEntire's pop culture popularity, with a release of this album (described on an MCA Records billboard as "Another MCA Masterpiece..."), an autobiography, and NBC Television special later in the year.

Track listing

Personnel 

Larry Byrom – acoustic guitar, electric guitar
 Melissa Coleman – backing vocals
Terry Crisp – steel guitar
Linda Davis – backing vocals
Vince Gill – backing vocals
 Chris Harris – backing vocals
 Mark Heimermann – backing vocals
Dann Huff – electric guitar
Reba McEntire – lead vocals
Joe McGlohon – saxophone
Steve Nathan – Hammond B-3 organ, piano, synthesizer
Michael Omartian – string arrangements, conductor
Chris Rodriguez – backing vocals
Matt Rollings – piano, Hammond B-3 organ, synthesizer, Wurlitzer electric piano
Leland Sklar – bass guitar
Carlos Vega – drums
Biff Watson – acoustic guitar
Chris Rodriguez – backing vocals
Lang Scott – backing vocals
Harry Stinson – background vocals
Nashville String Machine – string section

Backing vocals (Track 6)
 Bob Bailey
 Lisa Bevill
 Ashley Cleveland
 Kim Fleming 
 Lisa Glasgow
 Vicki Hampton
 Yvonne Hodges
 Donna McElroy
 Michael Mellett
 Chris Rodriguez

Production 
 Tony Brown – producer 
 Reba McEntire – producer 
 John Guess – recording engineer, mixing engineer, overdub recording engineer
 Derek Bason – assistant engineer, mix assistant, overdub recording assistant 
 Marty Williams – additional overdub recording
 Glenn Meadows – mastering engineer

Charts

Weekly charts

Year-end charts

Singles

Certifications and sales

References

1994 albums
Reba McEntire albums
MCA Records albums
Albums produced by Tony Brown (record producer)